Same-sex marriage, also known as gay marriage, is the marriage of two people of the same legal sex.  marriage between same-sex couples is legally performed and recognized in 34 countries, constituting some 1.35 billion people (17% of the world's population), with the most recent being Andorra.

Adoption rights are not necessarily covered, though most states with same-sex marriage allow those couples to jointly adopt as other married couples can. In contrast, 34 countries (as of 2021) have definitions of marriage in their constitutions that prevent marriage between couples of the same sex, most enacted in recent decades as a preventative measure. Some other countries have constitutionally mandated Islamic law, which is generally interpreted as prohibiting marriage between same-sex couples. In six of the former and most of the latter, homosexuality itself is criminalized. There are records of marriage between men dating back to the first century. It is legally recognized in a large majority of the world's developed democracies, while it is not in all of the world's Islamic polities and most Marxist-Leninist states. Some countries, such as China and Russia, ban advocacy for the legal recognition of same-sex marriages.

The first same-sex couple to be married legally in modern times were Michael McConnell and Jack Baker in 1971 in the United States; they were married in the county of Hennepin County, Minnesota. The first law providing for marriage equality between same-sex and opposite-sex couples was passed in the continental Netherlands in 2000 and took effect on 1 April 2001. The application of marriage law equally to same-sex and opposite-sex couples has varied by jurisdiction, and has come about through legislative change to marriage law, court rulings based on constitutional guarantees of equality, recognition that marriage of same-sex couples is allowed by existing marriage law, and by direct popular vote, such as through referendums and initiatives.

Scientific studies show that the financial, psychological, and physical well-being of gay people are enhanced by marriage, and that the children of same-sex parents benefit from being raised by married same-sex couples within a marital union that is recognized by law and supported by societal institutions. Social science research indicates that the exclusion of homosexuals from marriage stigmatizes and invites public discrimination against them, with research repudiating the notion that either civilization or viable social orders depend upon restricting marriage to heterosexuals. Same-sex marriage can provide those in committed same-sex relationships with relevant government services and make financial demands on them comparable to that required of those in opposite-sex marriages, and also gives them legal protections such as inheritance and hospital visitation rights. Opposition is based on claims such as that homosexuality is unnatural and abnormal, that the recognition of same-sex unions will promote homosexuality in society, and that children are better off when raised by opposite-sex couples. According to major medical organizations, these claims are refuted by scientific studies, homosexuality is a natural and normal variation in human sexuality, sexual orientation is not a choice, and children of same-sex couples fare just as well as the children of opposite-sex couples.

Terminology

Alternative terms

Some proponents of the legal recognition of same-sex marriage—such as Marriage Equality USA (founded in 1998), Freedom to Marry (founded in 2003), and Canadians for Equal Marriage - used the terms marriage equality and equal marriage to signal that their goal was for same-sex marriage to be recognized on equal ground with opposite-sex marriage. The Associated Press recommends the use of same-sex marriage over gay marriage. In deciding whether to use the term gay marriage, it may also be noted that not everyone in a same-sex marriage is gay - for example, some are bisexual - and therefore using the term gay marriage is sometimes considered erasure of such people.

Use of the term marriage
Anthropologists have struggled to determine a definition of marriage that absorbs commonalities of the social construct across cultures around the world. Many proposed definitions have been criticized for failing to recognize the existence of same-sex marriage in some cultures, including those of more than 30 African peoples, such as the Kikuyu and Nuer.

With several countries revising their marriage laws to recognize same-sex couples in the 21st century, all major English dictionaries have revised their definition of the word marriage to either drop gender specifications or supplement them with secondary definitions to include gender-neutral language or explicit recognition of same-sex unions. The Oxford English Dictionary has recognized same-sex marriage since 2000.

Opponents of same-sex marriage who want marriage to be restricted to pairings of a man and a woman, such as the Church of Jesus Christ of Latter-day Saints, the Catholic Church, and the Southern Baptist Convention, use the term traditional marriage to mean opposite-sex marriage.

History

Ancient
A reference to marriage between same-sex couples appears in the Sifra, which was written in the 3rd century CE. The Book of Leviticus prohibited homosexual relations, and the Hebrews were warned not to "follow the acts of the land of Egypt or the acts of the land of Canaan" (Lev. 18:22, 20:13). The Sifra clarifies what these ambiguous "acts" were, and that they included marriage between same-sex couples: "A man would marry a man and a woman a woman, a man would marry a woman and her daughter, and a woman would be married to two men."

What is arguably the first historical mention of the performance of marriages between same-sex couples occurred during the early Roman Empire according to controversial historian John Boswell. These were usually reported in a critical or satirical manner.

Roman child emperor Elagabalus referred to his chariot driver, a blond slave from Caria named Hierocles, as his husband. He also married an athlete named Zoticus in a lavish public ceremony in Rome amidst the rejoicings of the citizens.

According to Craig A. Williams, some Romans as early as the first century clearly did participate in formal ceremonies in which two males were married. These marriages were seen as atypical: Williams writes that "a marriage between two fully gendered 'men' was inconceivable; if two males were joined together, one of them had to be 'the woman.'"

The first Roman emperor to have married a man was Nero, who is reported to have married two other males on different occasions. The first was with one of Nero's own freedmen, Pythagoras, with whom Nero took the role of the bride. Later, as a groom, Nero married Sporus, a young boy, to replace his wife Poppaea Sabina following her death, and married him in a very public ceremony with all the solemnities of matrimony, after which Sporus was forced to pretend to be the female concubine that Nero had killed and act as though they were really married. A friend gave the "bride" away as required by law. The marriage was celebrated in both Greece and Rome in extravagant public ceremonies.

Conubium existed only between a civis Romanus and a civis Romana (that is, between a male Roman citizen and a female Roman citizen), so that a marriage between two Roman males (or with a slave) would have no legal standing in Roman law (apart, presumably, from the arbitrary will of the emperor in the two aforementioned cases). Furthermore, according to Susan Treggiari, "matrimonium was then an institution involving a mother, mater. The idea implicit in the word is that a man took a woman in marriage, in matrimonium ducere, so that he might have children by her."

In 342 AD, Christian emperors Constantius II and Constans issued a law in the Theodosian Code (C. Th. 9.7.3) prohibiting marriage between same-sex couples in Rome and ordering execution for those so married. Professor Fontaine of Cornell University Classics Department has pointed out that there is no provision for marriage between same-sex couples in Roman Law, and the text from 342 CE is corrupt, "marries a woman" might be "goes to bed in a dishonorable manner with a man" as a condemnation of homosexual behavior between men.

The Boxer Codex, dated 1590, records the normality and acceptance of same-sex marriage in the native cultures of the Philippines prior to colonization. In 1834, Anne Lister married Ann Walker prior to legalization in England.

Contemporary

The first same-sex couple to be married legally in modern times were Michael McConnell and Jack Baker in 1971, in Hennepin County, Minnesota. Historians variously trace the beginning of the modern movement in support of same-sex marriage to anywhere from around the 1980s to the 1990s. In the United States, same-sex marriage became an official request of gay rights movement after the Second National March on Washington for Lesbian and Gay Rights in 1987.

In 1989, Denmark became the first country to legally recognize a relationship for same-sex couples, establishing registered partnerships, which gave those in same-sex relationships "most rights of married heterosexuals, but not the right to adopt or obtain joint custody of a child". In 2001, the continental Netherlands became the first country to broaden marriage laws to include same-sex couples. Since then, same-sex marriage has been established by law in 33 other countries, including most of the Americas and Western Europe. Yet its spread has been uneven — South Africa is the only country in Africa to take the step; Taiwan is the only one in Asia.

Timeline

The summary table below lists in chronological order the sovereign states (United Nations member states plus Taiwan) that have legalized same-sex marriage. As of 2023, 34 states have legalized.

Dates are when marriages between same-sex couples began to be officially certified.

Same-sex marriage around the world

Same-sex marriage is legally performed and recognized in the following countries: Andorra, Argentina, Australia, Austria, Belgium, Brazil, Canada, Chile, Colombia, Costa Rica, Cuba, Denmark, Ecuador, Finland, France, Germany, Iceland, Ireland, Luxembourg, Malta, Mexico, the Netherlands, New Zealand, Norway, Portugal, Slovenia, South Africa, Spain, Sweden, Switzerland, Taiwan, the United Kingdom,  the United States, and Uruguay. 

Same-sex marriage is under consideration by the legislature or the courts in Aruba, the Choctaw Nation, Curaçao, Czech Republic, Japan, Greece, Honduras, India, Liechtenstein, Namibia, the Navajo Nation, and Venezuela.

Civil unions are being considered in a number of countries, including Lithuania, the Philippines, Serbia,  Peru, and Ukraine.

On 12 March 2015, the European Parliament passed a non-binding resolution encouraging EU institutions and member states to "[reflect] on the recognition of same-sex marriage or same-sex civil union as a political, social and human and civil rights issue". In 2018, the Inter-American Court of Human Rights ruled that all signatory countries must allow same-sex marriage.

Notable countries:

  United States: The first country where a local jurisdiction knowingly issued a marriage license to a same-sex couple (1971)
  Denmark: The first country to offer civil unions (1989)
  Netherlands: The first country to legalize same-sex marriage, and the first European one (2001)
  Canada: The first American country to legalize same-sex marriage (2005)
  South Africa: The first country to legalize same-sex marriage through court ruling and the first African one (2005)
  Mexico: The first local jurisdiction to legalize same-sex marriage in Latin America (2010)
  Argentina: The first South American country to legalize same-sex marriage (2010)
  New Zealand: The first Oceanian country to legalize same-sex marriage (2013)
  Ireland: The first country to legalize same-sex marriage through referendum (2015)
  Taiwan: The first Asian country to legalize same-sex marriage (2019)
  Cuba: The first one-party state to legalize same-sex marriage (2022)

In response to the international spread of same-sex marriage, a number of countries have enacted preventative constitutional bans, with the most recent being Georgia in 2018 and Russia in 2020. In other countries, constitutions have been adopted which have wording specifying that marriage is between a man and a woman, although, especially with the older constitutions, they were not necessarily worded with the intent to ban same-sex marriage.

International court rulings

European Court of Human Rights 
In 2010, the European Court of Human Rights (ECHR) ruled in Schalk and Kopf v Austria, a case involving an Austrian same-sex couple who were denied the right to marry. The court found, by a vote of 4 to 3, that their human rights had not been violated. The court further stated that same-sex unions are not protected under art. 12 of ECHR ("Right to marry"), which exclusively protects the right to marry of opposite-sex couples (without regard if the sex of the partners is the result of birth or of sex change), but they are protected under art. 8 of ECHR ("Right to respect for private and family life") and art. 14 ("Prohibition of discrimination"). Furthermore, under European Convention of Human Rights, states are not obliged to allow same-sex marriage:

British Judge Sir Nicolas Bratza, then head of the European Court of Human Rights, delivered a speech in 2012 that signaled the court was ready to declare same-sex marriage a "human right", as soon as enough countries fell into line.

Article 12 of the European Convention on Human Rights states that: "Men and women of marriageable age have the right to marry and to found a family, according to the national laws governing the exercise of this right", not limiting marriage to those in a heterosexual relationship. However, the ECHR stated in Schalk and Kopf v Austria that this provision was intended to limit marriage to heterosexual relationships, as it used the term "men and women" instead of "everyone".

European Union 

On 5 June 2018, the European Court of Justice ruled, in a case from Romania, that, under the specific conditions of the couple in question, married same-sex couples have the same residency rights as other married couples in an EU country, even if that country does not permit or recognize same-sex marriage. However, the ruling was not implemented in Romania and on 14 September 2021 the European Parliament passed a resolution calling on the European Commission to ensure that the ruling is respected across the EU.

Inter-American Court of Human Rights 

On 8 January 2018, the Inter-American Court of Human Rights (IACHR) ruled that the American Convention on Human Rights mandates and requires the legal recognition of same-sex marriage. The landmark ruling was fully binding on Costa Rica and set binding precedent in the other signatory countries. The Court recommended that governments issue temporary decrees recognizing same-sex marriage until new legislation is brought in. Among states without same-sex marriage, the ruling applies to Barbados, Bolivia, the Dominican Republic, El Salvador, Guatemala, Haiti, Honduras, Nicaragua, Panama, Paraguay, Peru and Suriname.

The Court said that governments "must recognize and guarantee all the rights that are derived from a family bond between people of the same sex". They also said that it was inadmissible and discriminatory for a separate legal provision to be established (such as civil unions) instead of same-sex marriage. The Court demanded that governments "guarantee access to all existing forms of domestic legal systems, including the right to marriage, in order to ensure the protection of all the rights of families formed by same-sex couples without discrimination". Recognizing the difficulty in passing such laws in countries where there is strong opposition to same-sex marriage, it recommended that governments pass temporary decrees until new legislation is brought in.

The ruling has directly led to the legal recognition of same-sex marriage in Costa Rica and Ecuador. In the wake of the ruling, lawsuits regarding same-sex marriage have also been filed in Bolivia, Honduras, Panama, Paraguay (to recognize marriages performed abroad), and Peru, all of which are under the jurisdiction of the IACHR.

International organizations
The terms of employment of the staff of international organizations (not commercial) in most cases are not governed by the laws of the country where their offices are located. Agreements with the host country safeguard these organizations' impartiality.

Despite their relative independence, few organizations recognize same-sex partnerships without condition. The agencies of the United Nations recognize same-sex marriages if the country of citizenship of the employees in question recognizes the marriage. In some cases, these organizations do offer a limited selection of the benefits normally provided to mixed-sex married couples to de facto partners or domestic partners of their staff, but even individuals who have entered into a mixed-sex civil union in their home country are not guaranteed full recognition of this union in all organizations. However, the World Bank does recognize domestic partners.

Other arrangements

Civil unions

Civil union, civil partnership, domestic partnership, registered partnership, unregistered partnership, and unregistered cohabitation statuses offer varying legal benefits of marriage. Poland and Slovakia offer more limited rights. On a subnational level, the Dutch constituent country of Aruba allows same-sex couples to access civil unions or partnerships, but restrict marriage to couples of the opposite sex. Additionally, various cities and counties in Cambodia and Japan offer same-sex couples varying levels of benefits, which include hospital visitation rights and others.

Additionally, seventeen countries that have legally recognized same-sex marriage also have an alternative form of recognition for same-sex couples, usually available to heterosexual couples as well: Argentina, Australia, Austria, Belgium, Brazil, Chile, Colombia, Ecuador, France, Luxembourg, Malta, the Netherlands, Portugal, South Africa, Spain, the United Kingdom and Uruguay.

They are also available in parts of the United States (Arizona, California, Colorado, Hawaii, Illinois, New Jersey, Nevada and Oregon) and Canada.

Non-sexual same-sex marriage

Kenya

Female same-sex marriage is practiced among the Gikuyu, Nandi, Kamba, Kipsigis, and to a lesser extent neighboring peoples. About 5–10% of women are in such marriages. However, this is not seen as homosexual, but is instead a way for families without sons to keep their inheritance within the family.

Nigeria

Among the Igbo people and probably other peoples in the south of the country, there are circumstances where a marriage between women is considered appropriate, such as when a woman has no child and her husband dies, and she takes a wife to perpetuate her inheritance and family lineage.

Studies 
The American Anthropological Association stated on 26 February 2004:

Research findings from 1998 to 2015 from the University of Virginia, Michigan State University, Florida State University, the University of Amsterdam, the New York State Psychiatric Institute, Stanford University, the University of California-San Francisco, the University of California-Los Angeles, Tufts University, Boston Medical Center, the Committee on Psychosocial Aspects of Child and Family Health, and independent researchers also support the findings of this study.

Adolescence 
A study of nationwide data from across the United States (from January 1999 to December 2015) revealed that the rate of attempted suicide among school students in grades 9–12 declined by 7% and the rate of attempted suicide among high schoolers of a minority sexual orientation in grades 9–12 declined by 14% in states that established same-sex marriage, resulting in about 134,000 fewer attempting suicide each year in the United States. The researchers took advantage of the gradual manner in which same-sex marriage was established in the United States (expanding from one state in 2004 to all fifty states in 2015) to compare the rate of attempted suicide among youth in each state over the time period studied. Once same-sex marriage was established in a particular state, the reduction in the rate of attempted suicide among youth in that state became permanent. No reduction in the rate of attempted suicide among teenage youth occurred in a particular state until that state recognized same-sex marriage. The lead researcher of the study stated that "laws that have the greatest impact on gay adults may make gay kids feel more hopeful for the future".

Parenting

Professional organizations of psychologists have concluded that children stand to benefit from the well-being that results when their parents' relationship is recognized and supported by society's institutions, e.g. civil marriage. For example, the Canadian Psychological Association (CPA) stated in 2006 that "parents' financial, psychological and physical well-being is enhanced by marriage and that children benefit from being raised by two parents within a legally-recognized union." The CPA has stated that the stress encountered by gay and lesbian parents and their children are more likely the result of the way society treats them than because of any deficiencies in fitness to parent.

The American Academy of Pediatrics concluded in 2006, in an analysis published in the journal Pediatrics:

Health

The American Psychological Association stated in 2004: "Denial of access to marriage to same-sex couples may especially harm people who also experience discrimination based on age, race, ethnicity, disability, gender and gender identity, religion, socioeconomic status and so on." It has also averred that same-sex couples who may only enter into a civil union, as opposed to a marriage, "are denied equal access to all the benefits, rights, and privileges provided by federal law to those of married couples", which has adverse effects on the well-being of same-sex partners.

, the data of current psychological and other social science studies on same-sex marriage in comparison to mixed-sex marriage indicate that same-sex and mixed-sex relationships do not differ in their essential psychosocial dimensions; that a parent's sexual orientation is unrelated to their ability to provide a healthy and nurturing family environment; and that marriage bestows substantial psychological, social, and health benefits. Same-sex parents and carers and their children are likely to benefit in numerous ways from legal recognition of their families, and providing such recognition through marriage will bestow greater benefit than civil unions or domestic partnerships.

In 2009, a pair of economists at Emory University tied the passage of state bans on same-sex marriage in the United States to an increase in the rates of HIV infection. The study linked the passage of a same-sex marriage ban in a state to an increase in the annual HIV rate within that state of roughly 4 cases per 100,000 population. In 2010, a Columbia University Mailman School of Public Health study examining the effects of institutional discrimination on the psychiatric health of lesbian, gay and bisexual (LGB) individuals found an increase in psychiatric disorders, including a more than doubling of anxiety disorders, among the LGB population living in states that instituted bans on same-sex marriage. According to the author, the study highlighted the importance of abolishing institutional forms of discrimination, including those leading to disparities in the mental health and well-being of LGB individuals. Institutional discrimination is characterized by societal-level conditions that limit the opportunities and access to resources by socially disadvantaged groups.

Issues

While few societies have recognized same-sex unions as marriages, the historical and anthropological record reveals a large range of attitudes towards same-sex unions ranging from praise, through full acceptance and integration, sympathetic toleration, indifference, prohibition and discrimination, to persecution and physical annihilation. Opponents of same-sex marriages have argued that same-sex marriage, while doing good for the couples that participate in them and the children they are raising, undermines a right of children to be raised by their biological mother and father. Some supporters of same-sex marriages take the view that the government should have no role in regulating personal relationships, while others argue that same-sex marriages would provide social benefits to same-sex couples. The debate regarding same-sex marriages includes debate based upon social viewpoints as well as debate based on majority rules, religious convictions, economic arguments, health-related concerns, and a variety of other issues.

Parenting

Scientific literature indicates that parents' financial, psychological and physical well-being is enhanced by marriage and that children benefit from being raised by two parents within a legally recognized union (either a mixed-sex or same-sex union). As a result, professional scientific associations have argued for same-sex marriage to be legally recognized as it will be beneficial to the children of same-sex parents or carers.

Scientific research has been generally consistent in showing that lesbian and gay parents are as fit and capable as heterosexual parents, and their children are as psychologically healthy and well-adjusted as children reared by heterosexual parents. According to scientific literature reviews, there is no evidence to the contrary.

Adoption

All states that allow same-sex marriage also allow the joint adoption of children by those couples with the exceptions of Ecuador, Taiwan, and a third of states in Mexico; in Taiwan, only step-child adoption of biological children is allowed; in the others, no adoption is allowed, though such restrictions have been ruled unconstitutional in Mexico. In addition, Croatia, Israel and Liechtenstein, which do not recognize same-sex marriage nonetheless permit joint adoption by unmarried same-sex couples. Some additional states that do not recognize same-sex marriage allow stepchild adoption by couples in civil unions: Estonia, Italy (on a case-by-case basis) and San Marino.

As of 2010, more than 16,000 same-sex couples were raising an estimated 22,000 adopted children in the United States, 4% of all adopted children.

Surrogacy and IVF treatment

A gay or bisexual man has the option of surrogacy, the process in which a woman bears a child for another person through artificial insemination or carries another woman's surgically implanted fertilized egg to birth. A lesbian or bisexual woman has the option of artificial insemination. Whether these arrangements are legal are subject to controversy in several jurisdictions.

Transgender and intersex people

The legal status of same-sex marriage may have implications for the marriages of couples in which one or both parties are transgender, depending on how sex is defined within a jurisdiction. Transgender and intersex individuals may be prohibited from marrying partners of the "opposite" sex or permitted to marry partners of the "same" sex due to legal distinctions. In any legal jurisdiction where marriages are defined without distinction of a requirement of a male and female, these complications do not occur. In addition, some legal jurisdictions recognize a legal and official change of gender, which would allow a transgender male or female to be legally married in accordance with an adopted gender identity.

In the United Kingdom, the Gender Recognition Act 2004 allows a person who has lived in their chosen gender for at least two years to receive a gender recognition certificate officially recognizing their new gender. Because in the United Kingdom marriages were until recently only for mixed-sex couples and civil partnerships are only for same-sex couples, a person had to dissolve their civil partnership before obtaining a gender recognition certificate, and the same was formerly true for marriages in England and Wales, and still is in other territories. Such people are then free to enter or re-enter civil partnerships or marriages in accordance with their newly recognized gender identity. In Austria, a similar provision requiring transsexual people to divorce before having their legal sex marker corrected was found to be unconstitutional in 2006. In Quebec, prior to the legalization of same-sex marriage, only unmarried people could apply for legal change of gender. With the advent of same-sex marriage, this restriction was dropped. A similar provision including sterilization also existed in Sweden, but was phased out in 2013. In the United States, transgender and intersex marriages was subject to legal complications. As definitions and enforcement of marriage are defined by the states, these complications vary from state to state, as some of them prohibit legal changes of gender.

Divorce

In the United States before the case of Obergefell v. Hodges, couples in same-sex marriages could only obtain a divorce in jurisdictions that recognized same-sex marriages, with some exceptions.

Judicial and legislative

There are differing positions regarding the manner in which same-sex marriage has been introduced into democratic jurisdictions. A "majority rules" position holds that same-sex marriage is valid, or void and illegal, based upon whether it has been accepted by a simple majority of voters or of their elected representatives.

In contrast, a civil rights view holds that the institution can be validly created through the ruling of an impartial judiciary carefully examining the questioning and finding that the right to marry regardless of the gender of the participants is guaranteed under the civil rights laws of the jurisdiction.

Public opinion

Numerous polls and studies on the issue have been conducted. A trend of increasing support for same-sex marriage has been revealed across many countries of the world, often driven in large part by a generational difference in support. Polling that was conducted in developed democracies in this century shows a majority of people in support of same-sex marriage. Support for same-sex marriage has increased across every age group, political ideology, religion, gender, race and region of various developed countries in the world.

Various detailed polls and studies on same-sex marriage that were conducted in several countries show that support for same-sex marriage significantly increases with higher levels of education and is also significantly stronger among younger generations, with a clear trend of continually increasing support.

See also 

 LGBT rights by country or territory
 List of same-sex married couples
 Religion and sexuality
 Legal status of same-sex marriage
 Societal attitudes toward homosexuality

Notes

References

Bibliography

External links

 

 
LGBT-related legislation